Ram "Rami" Ben-Barak (born 1 April 1958) is a former member of the Israeli security forces and an Israeli politician. He served as deputy director of the Mossad and director general of the Ministry of Intelligence Services and the Ministry of Strategic Affairs.

He has served as a member of the Knesset for Yesh Atid since April 2019.

Early life
Barak was born and raised in Nahalal, Israel, to a Jewish family. In 1976 he joined the IDF and served as a combat soldier and as an officer in the Sayeret Matkal commando unit. In his last position he served as commander of the Counter Terrorism Division until his release in 1981.

Career
In 1984 he joined Mossad. In April 1991, he was arrested in Cyprus along with three other agents of the Mossad, posing as tourists during the operation to install listening devices at the Iranian embassy in Nicosia. They were convicted of trespassing, fined and returned to Israel. From 2009 to 2011 he served as deputy head of the Mossad. He was loaned to the IDF and served as coordinator of special operations.

He served as an advisor to the Israeli Embassy in Washington and a visiting research fellow at the Saban Center for Middle East Policy at the Brookings Institution.

From November 2018 until he entered Israeli politics in April 2019, he was a member of the advisory board of Shibumi, an international business intelligence firm that was founded by veterans from Israel's intelligence community.

Additionally, from January 2018 served as the chairman of the board at "Eye-Minders".

On 15 January 2018, he announced he was joining the Yesh Atid party and became a member of the Knesset in April 2019.

Personal life 
Ben-Barak studied at the National Defense College and political science at the University of Haifa, where he obtained an MA in government and national security. He is married with three children and lives in Nahalal.

References

External links 

1958 births
Living people
20th-century Israeli civil servants
20th-century Israeli military personnel
21st-century Israeli civil servants
Blue and White (political alliance) politicians
Israeli Jews
Israeli officers
Jewish Israeli politicians
Jewish military personnel
Members of the 21st Knesset (2019)
Members of the 22nd Knesset (2019–2020)
Members of the 23rd Knesset (2020–2021)
Members of the 24th Knesset (2021–2022)
Members of the 25th Knesset (2022–)
People from Nahalal
People of the Mossad
University of Haifa alumni
Yesh Atid politicians